Stuart Dermot Lee (born 3 February 1966) is a British specialist in information technology at Oxford University Computing Services and a Reader in E-learning at Oxford University, but is best known for his scholarly books on J. R. R. Tolkien. He is also an award winning playwright.

Biography 

Lee was born in Dublin, Ireland. He was educated at Bancroft's School, Essex. He read English and Economics at the University of Keele. He gained an M.A. in English literature at King's College London, and gained his PhD in Old English literature there in 1992, with a thesis on "Judith, Esther, and the Maccabees". He then obtained a postgraduate certificate in Education.

Lee briefly lectured at Royal Holloway and Bedford New College before moving to the University of Oxford, where he worked on the use of information technology for teaching. In 1996 he became Head of the Centre for Humanities Computing there. In 2001 he became head of the university's Learning Technologies Group, in 2005 director of computing systems and services for Oxford University Computing Services, and in 2012 Deputy CIO. He is also the University's Reader in Digital Libraries and eLearning, and a senior member of the Faculty of English where he lectures in Old English, Tolkien, and the poetry of the First World War.

In 2004 he completed his first play The Ghosts May Laugh, set in the trenches of the First World War. This was produced in Oxford and Edinburgh. His other plays include The Attic, Dev's Army, Quiz Night at the Britannia, The Intricate Workings of a Sherbet Lemon, An Academic's Progress, Leaf-mould.

Reception

A Companion to J. R. R. Tolkien 

Jorge Luis Bueno-Alonso, reviewing A Companion to J. R. R. Tolkien for Tolkien Studies, described Lee as "one of the outstanding names of recent Tolkien critical scholarship and co-author of one of the most imaginative books on the relationships between Tolkien’s fiction and medieval English literature (Lee & Solopova [2005])". Of the book, he wrote that it brought order to the morass of publications on Tolkien, and noted that it finally brought Tolkien into the canon of Anglo-American studies as it was one of the "prestigious" Blackwell Companion series. He described the challenge of making a brief 25-page overview of Tolkien's life, undertaken by John Garth in the volume, "an ", ("a work of giants").

Andrew Higgins, reviewing the book for the Journal of Tolkien Research, welcomed the "eminent line-up" of authors (naming Tom Shippey, Verlyn Flieger, Dimitra Fimi, John D. Rateliff and Gergely Nagy) of the work's 36 articles, and called it "joyous indeed that after many years of polite (and not so polite) disdain and dismissal by establishment “academics” and the “cultural intelligentsia”" that Tolkien had reached the "academic pantheon" of Blackwell Companions. Higgins applauded Lee for "the overall thematic structuring of this volume, which offers a progressive profile of Tolkien the man, the student and scholar, and the mythopoeist. I found Lee’s ordering of these papers most helpful".

Awards and distinctions 

 2008 Teaching award, Oxford University
 2009 Higher Education Authority National Teaching Fellow

Books

Literary 

 2005 The Keys of Middle-earth (with Elizabeth Solopova), Palgrave Macmillan. 2nd edition appeared in 2015.
 2006 Key Concepts in Medieval Literature (with Elizabeth Solopova), Macmillan. 
 2013 A Companion to J. R. R. Tolkien (edited), Wiley Blackwells. 2nd edition appeared in 2022.

Information technology 

 2000 Digital Imaging: A Practical Handbook, Facet.
 2001 Building an Electronic Resource Collection: A Practical Guide (with Frances Boyle), Facet.

References 

1966 births
Tolkien studies
People educated at Bancroft's School
Alumni of King's College London
Alumni of Keele University
Living people